Thorntown Public Library is a historic Carnegie library located at Thorntown, Boone County, Indiana.  It was built in 1914–1915, and is a one-story, three bay, brown brick building with a red clay tile hipped roof.  It has a round arched entrance and limestone trim.  Its construction was funded with $10,000 from the Carnegie Corporation of New York.

It was listed on the National Register of Historic Places in 1986.

The Thorntown Public Library today is one of three public libraries in Boone County.

References

External links
Thorntown Public Library website

Carnegie libraries in Indiana
Libraries on the National Register of Historic Places in Indiana
Library buildings completed in 1915
Buildings and structures in Boone County, Indiana
National Register of Historic Places in Boone County, Indiana
Public libraries in Indiana